Baldvin Baldvinsson (born 29 June 1943) is an Icelandic former footballer who played as a midfielder. He won four caps for the Iceland national football team between 1965 and 1971. He spent his entire domestic playing career with KR.

Baldvin won his first international cap on 6 July 1965 and scored the Iceland goal in a 1–3 defeat to Denmark. Over the next six years, he played three more matches for his country, and made his final appearance in the 0–0 draw with France on 12 May 1971.

International goals

References

1943 births
Living people
Baldvin Baldvinsson
Association football forwards
Baldvin Baldvinsson
Baldvin Baldvinsson